Table Head is a Neighborhood in the Canadian province of Nova Scotia, located in Glace Bay in the Cape Breton Regional Municipality on Cape Breton Island.

History
On December 15, 1902 Guglielmo Marconi established trans-Atlantic communication between Table Head in Glace Bay, Nova Scotia and Poldhu in Cornwall, England using a 60 kilowatt transmitter and four 210-foot (64 m) towers. The site of the Marconi Towers Station is now used to house a museum, the Marconi National Historic Site.

References

 Table Head on Destination Nova Scotia

Communities in the Cape Breton Regional Municipality
General Service Areas in Nova Scotia
Transatlantic telecommunications